A virus is a submicroscopic infectious agent that replicates only inside the living cells of an organism.

Virus or The Virus may also refer to:
 Computer virus, a type of malicious computer program
 Mobile virus, a type of malicious cell phone program

Brands and enterprises
 Virus (automobile), a French cyclecar
 Virus (clothing), an Israeli clothing brand
 Access Virus, a line of virtual analog synthesizers by German company Access Music
 Virus Buster Serge, a Japanese media franchise also known as Virus

Comics
 Virus (comics), a Dark Horse miniseries
 Virus (Spirou et Fantasio), an album of the Spirou et Fantasio comics series

Fictional entities
 Viruses, the main enemies from Dr. Mario
 Viruses, the main enemies in the Mega Man Battle Network series
 Virus, a sniper unit from Command & Conquer: Yuri's Revenge
 Viral, an artificial intelligence in Teenage Mutant Ninja Turtles

Film and television
 Virus (1980 film) or Fukkatsu no hi, a Japanese post-apocalyptic film by Kinji Fukasaku
 Virus - l'inferno dei morti viventi or Hell of the Living Dead, a 1980 Italian zombie film
 Virus (1995 film), a film based on the novel Outbreak by Robin Cook 
 Virus (1999 film), a science fiction-horror film by John Bruno
 Virus (2019 film), a Malayalam-language Indian film starring Asif Ali
 The Virus (TV series), a South Korean TV series

Literature
 Virus (novel), a 1964 science fiction novel by Sakyo Komatsu
 Viruses (journal), a scientific journal published by MDPI
 The Virus (novel), a 2015 thriller about a pandemic by Stanley Johnson

Music

Artists
 Virus (Argentine band), a new wave band formed in 1981
 Virus (British band), a thrash metal band formed in 1983
 Virus (Norwegian band), an avant-garde metal band 2000–2018
 Virus (Russian band), a band formed in 1999
 The Virus (band), an American punk band formed in 1998
 Sulfur (band), originally Virus, an American rock band 1991–1998
 Virus, a 1995 alias used by Paul Oakenfold
 Virus, a German band that participated in a 1971 Ken Hensley side project

Albums
 Virus (Dado Polumenta album) or the title song, 2011
 Virus (Haken album), 2020
 Virus (Heavenly album) or the title song, 2006
 Virus (Hypocrisy album), 2005
 Virus (Slank album) or the title song, 2001
 The Virus (album), by Brotha Lynch Hung, 2001
 Virus, by Big Boy, 2000
 Virus, by Excision, 2016

Songs
 "Virus" (Björk song), 2011
 "Virus" (Front Line Assembly song), 1991
 "Virus" (Iron Maiden song), 1996
 "Virus" (KMFDM song), 1989
 "Virus" (LaFee song), 2006
 "Virus (How About Now)", by Martin Garrix and MOTi, 2014
 "Virus", by Avail from Dixie, 1994
 "Virus", by Deltron 3030 from Deltron 3030, 2000
 "Virus", by Pitchshifter from Infotainment?, 1996

People
 Virus (musician) or Andre Michel Karkos, lead guitarist of Device
 Virus (wrestler) or Ricardo Amezquita Cardeño (born 1968), professional wrestler

Video games
 Virus, a prototype version of the NES game  Dr. Mario
 Virus (1988 video game), a port of the 1987 computer game Zarch
 Virus (1997 video game), a video game by Hudson Soft
 Virus: The Game, a 1997 computer game by Sir-Tech
 Virus: It Is Aware, a 1999 video game by Cryo

See also
 List of viruses
 Viral (disambiguation)